Petroleum spirit(s) may refer to:

 Gasoline (or petrol), a clear petroleum-derived flammable liquid that is used primarily as a fuel
 Petroleum ether, liquid hydrocarbon mixtures used chiefly as non-polar solvents
 White spirit or mineral spirits, a common organic solvent used in painting and decorating

See also
 Petroleum, a naturally occurring black liquid found in geological formations